Marcantonio Trevisan (c. 1475 - 31 May 1554), was the 80th Doge of Venice from 1553 to 1554.

References

16th-century Doges of Venice